CDA, Cda, or CdA may refer to:

In education
Central Delta Academy, a private school in Mississippi
Certified dental assistant, in the United States
Child Development Associate, a credential in the early care and education
Communicative Disorders Assistant, a credential in assisting a registered Audiologist or Speech Language Pathologist, in Canada
Coram Deo Academy, a private Christian school in Flower Mound, Texas

In law and government

Government agencies
Capital Development Authority, a kind of government entity
Capital Development Authority (Islamabad), the Capital Development Authority of Pakistan
Combined Development Agency, a uranium purchasing authority run by the US and UK government from 1948
Canadian Defence Academy, an organization in the Canadian Forces

Laws
Communications Decency Act, a US law found partially unconstitutional
Crime and Disorder Act 1998, a UK law

Other uses in law and government
Chargé d'Affaires
Confidential disclosure agreement
Criminal defense attorney

Organizations

Political parties and lobbying groups
Christian Democratic Alliance (South Africa)
Christian Democrats of America, a Christian democratic organization in the US 
Christian Democratic Appeal, a Christian democratic party in the Netherlands
College Democrats of America, the official youth outreach arm of the US Democratic Party
Conservative Democratic Alliance, in the UK

Other organizations
Catholic Daughters of the Americas, a Catholic women's charitable organization
Canadian Dental Association, an association of dentists in Canada
Diabetes Canada, which was known until 2017 as the Canadian Diabetes Association
Club de Deportes Antofagasta, a Chilean football club
Chinese Daoist Association

In science and technology

In chemistry
Chiral derivatizing agent, a type of chemical designed to react with enantiomers to indicate the enantiopurity
Completely denatured alcohol, the most heavily denatured alcohol

In computing
".cda", a filename extension for a Compact Disc Audio track
Cellular digital accessory, a means to identify the software version of a mobile phone
Red Book (audio CD standard), Compact Disc Audio, the standard format for a CD
Content Delivery Application, a component of a typical content management system

In health and medicine
Canadian Dental Association, an association of dentists in Canada
Diabetes Canada, which was known until 2017 as the Canadian Diabetes Association
Chlorproguanil/dapsone/artesunate, an antimalarial drug
Clinical Document Architecture, a healthcare documentation standard
Congenital dyserythropoietic anemia, a blood condition
Cytidine deaminase, an enzyme
Communicative disorders assistant, a profession

In spaceflight
Command and data acquisition station, in spacecraft operations
Cosmic dust analyzer, an instrument on the Cassini–Huygens spacecraft

In mathematics
Cantor's diagonal argument, a proof technique in set theory

Other uses on science and technology
Canonical discriminant analysis, a type of linear discriminant analysis
Cda, abbreviation for the orchid genus Cochlioda
Continuous descent approach, an aircraft approach method designed to reduce fuel burn and noise
Controlled droplet application, a concept for improving the efficiency of pesticide application
 or drag area value, the product of the drag coefficient and a reference area
, the drag area in automobile aerodynamics
Current differencing amplifier, amplifier taking current difference as input and voltage as output

Other uses
Caran d'Ache (company), a Swiss fine arts products company
Coeur d'Alene (disambiguation), multiple meanings
, an airline from the Dominican Republic
Critical discourse analysis, in critical theory
 Chantiers de l'Atlantique, French shipyard

zea:CDA